The Ukrainian National Youth Competition is Ukrainian organization of the Ukrainian Association of Football that conducts association football competitions among youth teams in four (4) age categories (under-14, U-15, U-16, and U-17) and originally consisted of two tiers the Supreme and the First Leagues. The Supreme Leagues consists out of four regional groups and the First have eight. In 2020 there was introduced the Elite League (top tier). The competition's oldest age group has the teenagers who are no older than 17 years old and the youngest - the teenagers no older than 14.

Along with the Professional Football League of Ukraine starting in 2016 the Youth League is also co-organizer of separate Under-19 competitions.

Composition
The league is composed of teams with players between ages under 14 through under 17. The league features teams of various association football and sports school and in addition to them each club of the Ukrainian Premier League is obligated to field four of its junior teams in the league.
 Football academies of Premier league clubs
 sports schools (Soviet children-youth sports school network, DUSSh)
 sports schools of Olympic reserve (Soviet children-youth sports schools of Olympic reserve network, SDUShOR)
 youth football clubs (Children-youth football clubs, DUFC)
 colleges of physical culture (UFK)
 colleges of Olympic reserve (UOR)

Competitions
The youth competitions started in 1998, yet the youth league was established not until 2001. In 2000 there was established a separate football competition among students of universities.

In 2002 the Professional Football League of Ukraine (PFL Ukraine) established experimental under-19 competitions among junior teams of the PFL clubs which however was discontinued four seasons later. With the PFL u-19 competitions ongoing in 2004, PFL Ukraine established separate competition among reserves (doubles) for club of the Top League (Vyshcha Liha), the precursor of the Ukrainian Premier League. The Top league teams that competed in the PFL u-19 competitions were moved to the new competitions. Introduction of the new Top League reserve competitions led to withdrawal of some reserve teams or the second teams (so called dvushki) that competed at Ukrainian Second League and in the way clearing the football "pyramid" of farm teams.

Earlier youth competition
List of best finishers for youth competitions before establishment of the actual Ukrainian Youth Football League.

Ukrainian Youth Football League (Top League)

Top League winners

Teams under-17

Notes:

Teams under-16

Notes:

Teams under-15

Notes:

Teams under-14

Notes:

References

External links
 Official webpage at the Football Federation of Ukraine website
 Official website
 Gold Talant (goldtalant.com.ua). Ukrainian football talents

Youth
Youth football in Ukraine
Ukrainian Association of Football